The masked mouse-tailed dormouse (Myomimus personatus) is a species of rodent in the family Gliridae. It is found in Iran and Turkmenistan.

References

Sources

Further reading
 
 
 
 

Myomimus
Mammals described in 1924
Taxonomy articles created by Polbot